The Golden D is the second solo album by Blur guitarist Graham Coxon, released in 2000. This outing saw him come back with some heavier, even lower-fi guitars and vocals. With only one track reminiscent of The Sky Is Too High, "Keep Hope Alive," the album was a departure from both Blur and his previous work. The album features two covers, "Fame and Fortune" and "That's When I Reach for My Revolver", both from early eighties post punk band Mission of Burma. All other tracks were written by Coxon, who recorded all instruments, produced and mixed the album as well.  The title of the album is a tongue in cheek reference to his favourite guitar chord, possibly at the time or a constant preference.

The album cover is a portion of Coxon's painting "The Blue Dog".

Critical reception

The Golden D was met with "mixed or average" reviews from critics. At Metacritic, which assigns a weighted average rating out of 100 to reviews from mainstream publications, this release received an average score of 56 based on 13 reviews.

In a review for AllMusic, Amy Schroeder said: "Golden D which is named after the musical chord, focuses on rock - the hard and fast variety - and suggests Sonic Youth and Sex Pistols."

Track listing
All songs written by Graham Coxon, except with note.

"Jamie Thomas" – 2:32
"The Fear" – 3:02
"Satan I Gatan" – 3:18
"Fame and Fortune" (Roger Miller)– 3:35
"My Idea of Hell" – 2:14
"Lake" – 7:34
"Fags and Failure" – 1:54
"Leave Me Alone" – 3:10
"Keep Hope Alive" – 3:56
"Oochy Woochy" – 4:24
"That's When I Reach for My Revolver" (Clint Conley) – 3:58
"Don't Think About Always" – 4:43

References

External links
 
 

2000 albums
Graham Coxon albums